John Rosenbaum (September 3, 1934 in Brigantine, New Jersey – September 30, 2003 in Alameda, California), was an American physicist, educator
 and kinetic sculptor, associated with the San Francisco Renaissance
 and the counterculture of the 1960s.

Biography
John Rosenbaum graduated from Cornell University with a degree in engineering physics in 1957. He moved to the San Francisco Bay Area in the early 1960s. He contributed to the Harvard Project Physics textbooks. He was associated with the free school movement in the 1960s, and was a colleague of the educator Herbert Kohl, who described Rosenbaum's educational work in his books The Open Classroom and Math, Writing & Games in the Open Classroom. He designed the Xylopipes xylophone children's toy for Creative Playthings. Rosenbaum created "Light Boxes", kinetic sculptures using polarized light and layers of cellophane laminated between pairs of rotating glass disks, producing changing patterns and colors similar to, and on a smaller scale than, light shows projected at rock concerts in the 1960s. He was exhibited by the Landau Gallery in Beverly Hills, among others. He was a colleague of silk screen artist Arthur Okamura. He designed the original logo for Herbie Mann's Embryo Records. He died in Alameda, California, of complications from Parkinson's disease in 2003.

Exhibitions

1969 Felix Landau Gallery, Los Angeles
1975 Walnut Creek, California (with Arthur Okamura)

See also

Photoelasticity, related to the birefringent properties of cellophane, as used in Rosenbaum's kinetic sculptures

References

External links
Examples of the optical effects used in "Light Boxes":
sugar syrup solution placed between 2 linear polarizers, producing 3 primary colors
multiple examples of color produced from polarized light and clear plastics

Artists from the San Francisco Bay Area
Cornell University College of Engineering alumni
20th-century American educators
Contemporary sculptors
20th-century sculptors
Deaths from Parkinson's disease
Neurological disease deaths in California
1934 births
2003 deaths
Artists from New Jersey
People from Brigantine, New Jersey
Light artists
Toy designers
Educators from New Jersey